

Non-Indian scholars 
 Col. Colin McKenzi - Later 18th century, for the first time he studied Kannada inscriptions.
 The study of Kannada inscriptions then continued by the following scholars
 John Faithfull Fleet
 Walter Elliot
 L.D. Barnett
 A.C. Burnell (Arthur Coke Burnell)
 J.F.Fleet
 B.L.Rice (B. Lewis Rice, Twelve volumes of Epigraphia Carnatica)
 Theodre Hope

Indian scholars 
Later Indian scholars started the study of Kannada inscriptions
They contributed from finding to analyzing (including deciphering, publishing) inscriptions.

Institutions
 Following institutions contributed for the study of Kannada inscriptions
 University of Mysore
 Archaeological Survey of India (South Indian inscriptions)
 Karnataka University and Kannada Research Institute (6 volumes of Karnataka inscriptions)
 Kannada University (9 volumes of North Karnataka and Andhra Pradesh inscriptions)
 Tumkur University, Tumakuru (volumes of the Inscriptions of cattle raiders)

See also
 "Sources of Karnataka History - Vol I" by S. Srikanta Sastri
 "Samshodhana Lekhanagalu" by S. Srikanta Sastri
 Early Indian epigraphy
 Extinct Kannada literature
 Shasana Samshodhane, Samshodhaneya siri, Turugol Sankathana, Kannada Shasana Shilpa,Penbuyyal, Krishnadevarayana Shasana samputa, Proudadevarayana Shasanagalu Volumes By Dr. D.V. Paramashivamurthy
Inscription Stones of Bangalore - a civic activism project to raise awareness and protect ancient inscription stones (shila shaasanas) found in the Bengaluru region.

References 

"
Kannada inscriptions
Inscriptions
 People
Kannada inscriptions